The 1978 Utah State Aggies football team represented Utah State University during the 1978 NCAA Division I-A football season as a new member of the Pacific Coast Athletic Association (PCAA). Led by third-year head coach Bruce Snyder, the previously-independent Aggies played their home games on campus at Romney Stadium in Logan, Utah. They opened with five wins and finished with a 7–4 record (4–1 PCAA, tied for first).

A noteworthy game was against Idaho State (of nearby Pocatello), the first college football season-opener played in Japan.

Schedule

Roster

Notes

References

Utah State
Utah State Aggies football seasons
Big West Conference football champion seasons
Utah State football